CLRC may mean
 Central Laboratory of the Research Councils, UK government research body
 Criminal Law Revision Committee, England and Wales
 California Law Revision Commission
 Children's Literature Research Collection, University of Minnesota Libraries
 Civilian Linguist Reserve Corps, now the National Language Service Corps, United States